Centro Nacional de Rehabilitación is a hospital in San José, Costa Rica.

References

Hospitals in San José, Costa Rica
Hospitals in Costa Rica